Ian Fok Chun-wan, SBS, JP (born 12 May 1949) is the Chief Executive of the Fok Ying Tung Foundation and the life honorary chairman of the Chinese General Chamber of Commerce. He is the incumbent Hong Kong delegate to the National People's Congress.

Son of famous pro-China tycoon Henry Fok, he was graduated from the University of British Columbia with the Master of Business Administration. He was made Justice of the Peace in 2003 and was awarded Silver Bauhinia Star (SBS) in 2005. He was first elected to the 11th National People's Congress in 2007 and was re-elected in 2011 and 2017. He is also the vice-chairman of the All-China Youth Federation and director of the Bank of East Asia.

References

1949 births
Living people
Delegates to the 11th National People's Congress from Hong Kong
Delegates to the 12th National People's Congress from Hong Kong
Delegates to the 13th National People's Congress from Hong Kong
Hong Kong businesspeople
Hong Kong Affairs Advisors
University of British Columbia alumni
Recipients of the Silver Bauhinia Star